Air Vice Marshal Richard Anthony "Tony" Mason,  (born 22 October 1932) is a retired senior commander of the Royal Air Force who became Air Secretary.

Early life
Mason was born on 22 October 1932, the son of William and Maud Mason. He was educated at the then all-boys private Bradford Grammar School and at the University of St Andrews, from where he graduated with a Master of Arts (MA).

Military career
Mason was commissioned into the Education Branch of the Royal Air Force as a flying officer on 29 June 1956 with the service number 504826. Promoted to flight lieutenant on 29 December 1958, he was appointed to a permanent commission on 1 July 1959. He was promoted to squadron leader on 17 February 1963 and to wing commander on 1 July 1970. He attended the United States Air Forces's Air War College located in Maxwell Air Force Base, Montgomery, Alabama in 1971 and the RAF's Staff College in Bracknell, Berkshire in 1972.

He became Director of Defence Studies in 1976. He was promoted to group captain on 1 January 1977. In the 1981 Queen's Birthday Honours, he was appointed Commander of the Order of the British Empire (CBE). He was appointed Director of Personnel (Ground) in 1982, and promoted to air commodore on 1 January 1983 as part of the half-yearly promotions. He became Air Secretary in 1985, having been Deputy Air Secretary in 1984. He was promoted to air vice marshal on 1 January 1986, once again as part of the half-yearly promotions. He was appointed Companion of the Order of the Bath (CB) in the 1988 Queen's Birthday Honours. He was succeeded as Air Secretary by Air Vice Marshal Robert Honey on 10 February 1989.

He retired from the Royal Air Force on 22 April 1989.

Later life
Following his retirement from the RAF, Mason became an academic. In 1996, he was made an honorary professor of the University of Birmingham. He had been Director of its Centre for Studies in Security and Diplomacy from 1988 to 2001. He was a specialist air adviser to the House of Commons Defence Committee between 2001 and 2006.

He was made an Honorary Fellow of the Royal Aeronautical Society (Hon FRAeS) in 2006. In March 2002, he was commissioned a deputy lieutenant (DL) to the Lord Lieutenant of Gloucestershire.

Personal life
In 1956 he married Margaret Sneddon Stewart; they had two daughters Lindsay and Pamela (died 1985).

Published works
The Aerospace Revolution: Role Revision and Technology – An Overview
Mason, Tony To Inherit the Skies: From Spitfire to Tornado, Brassey, 1990, 
Mason, Tony Air Power: a Centennial Appraisal, Brassey's, 2003,

References

1932 births
Living people
People educated at Bradford Grammar School
Alumni of the University of St Andrews
Royal Air Force air marshals
Companions of the Order of the Bath
Commanders of the Order of the British Empire
Deputy Lieutenants of Gloucestershire